Zieleń may refer to the following places:
Zieleń, Greater Poland Voivodeship (west-central Poland)
Zieleń, Kuyavian-Pomeranian Voivodeship (north-central Poland)
Zieleń, Łódź Voivodeship (central Poland)
Zieleń, Warmian-Masurian Voivodeship (north Poland)